Abdul Latif Jameel is a family-owned diversified business founded in Saudi Arabia in 1945 by the late Sheikh Abdul Latif Jameel (1909–1993). Operating across 7 core business sectors, Abdul Latif Jameel has a presence in over 30 countries across 6 continents.

History 
1940s-60s

Abdul Latif Jameel was founded in Jeddah, Saudi Arabia, in 1945 by Sheikh Abdul Latif Jameel. It became a Toyota distributor in the Kingdom in 1955, a position it has retained till today.

1970s-80s

In 1979, Abdul Latif Jameel United Finance Company (ALJUF), a financial services company aimed at further supporting Toyota vehicle sales in Saudi Arabia, was established. In the same year, the company also set up a consumer product business which imports electronics and consumer durables. In 1981, it established an outdoor advertising company to support the marketing of Toyota products. It also began exporting and distributing Lexus passenger vehicles in 1989, opening the first dedicated Lexus centre in Saudi Arabia four years later.

1990s-2000s

In 1990, Abdul Latif Jameel established an automotive accessories and conversion business in Saudi Arabia. In 1993, after the death of his father, Mohammed Abdul Latif Jameel assumed the leadership role in the company and, today, is the President and CEO. In the same year, the company started operating a Toyota distributorship in Algeria. Two years later, in 1995, another dealership was started in Morocco.

In 1996, Abdul Latif Jameel established a general trading company in Japan, which now has an experiential open business centre in Tokyo. Two years later, the company’s first Toyota dealership businesses in China and a Daihatsu distributorship in Turkey were launched. A Daihatsu distributorship in Morocco and a financial services company in Egypt were also established in 1999.

In 2001, Japan-based DENSO Corporation (DENSO International America's parent company) and Abdul Latif Jameel Co., Ltd. jointly established a company that produces car heating, ventilation and air conditioners (HVAC) in Jeddah. In 2003, Abdul Latif Jameel's accessories and conversion business in Saudi Arabia became an approved Toyota Development Base, and the company established an aftermarket parts business. In the same year, the company also established Abdul Latif Jameel Community Initiatives, its corporate social responsibility (CSR) arm.

On the 50th anniversary of its collaboration with Toyota Motor Company, Abdul Latif Jameel launched a Lexus dealership in Japan and a Daihatsu distributorship in Saudi Arabia in 2005. The next year, the company also established Toyota and Lexus dealerships in the UK (later sold in 2017), and a Daihatsu dealership in Egypt. It also launched a Hino distributorship in Algeria in 2007, and the DJ aftermarket vehicle parts in 2008. In 2009, it established a Toyota distributorship in Turkey and a Hino distributorship in Egypt.

2010s-Present Day

In 2010, Abdul Latif Jameel launched a Hino distributorship in Morocco. The next year, the company's aftermarket division acquired the Malaysian company FBK and expanded into China and Malaysia. In 2012, Abdul Latif Jameel established its Energy and Environmental Services division, launched a financial services division to support Toyota sales in Turkey, and opened the first Lexus dealership in China. That year, the company also relocated its international operations headquarters from Beirut to Dubai.

Abdul Latif Jameel and Sumitomo Corporation formed a JV (known presently as Abdul Latif Jameel Machinery) in 2013 for distributing Komatsu heavy equipment in Saudi Arabia. In the same year, Abdul Latif Jameel established a real estate development division, Abdul Latif Jameel Land. It also set up a Ford distributorship in Egypt and acquired a refrigerated vehicle conversion manufacturer in Turkey, in 2013.

In 2013, King Abdullah Economic City and Abdul Latif Jameel signed an agreement for the purchase of 1.5 million sqm land in KAEC-Industrial Valley. The company agreed to invest SR 1.2 billion to build a complex for the import, distribution, component manufacture and assembly of cars. The next year, Abdul Latif Jameel signed a joint venture MoA with the Dubai-based regional property developer, Emaar Properties, and also hosted a delegation from the Family Business Network (FBN) International (now known as the Family Business Council-Gulf) at its UAE regional headquarters.

Abdul Latif Jameel also began a joint venture with the Spain-based company Fotowatio Renewable Ventures (FRV) in 2014, and acquired FRV in 2015.

In May 2016, Abdul Latif Jameel opened launched the first Lexus brand distributorship in Turkey. In the same year, the company also announced its intention to invest US$2.2 billion in Saudi Arabia over the next 5 years as part of its long-term expansion plans. This includes an expansion of the Toyota outlet network, the opening a Lexus showroom in Riyadh Saudi Arabia, and the opening of a new flagship Komatsu facility in Jeddah, Saudi Arabia. In 2016, Abdul Latif Jameel Land began building J│ONE Residences, its first residential project in Jeddah, Saudi Arabia.

At the World Future Energy Summit 2017, in Abu Dhabi, Abdul Latif Jameel Energy announced the launch of Almar Water Solutions. Abdul Latif Jameel Energy also started construction on the two of the largest solar projects in Jordan. The projects, called Mafraq I &II, are scheduled to generate approximately 2% of Jordan's total generation capacity. In the same year, the company's electronics division was rebranded and re-launched as Redsea.

In April 2018, Abdul Latif Jameel Land launched J|ONE residencies. In October, it established the first Lexus showroom in Morocco, launching it at the Auto Expo 2018 in Casablanca. In the same year, Abdul Latif Jameel Energy also announced its first large-scale solar project in India: the 138-MW DC Solar Farm in Andhra Pradesh. Abdul Latif Jameel Machinery also announced a strategic partnership with Kanoo Machinery.

Abdul Latif Jameel Energy established a wind energy project in 2019 in Japan. Supported by the regional power companies Hokkaido Electric Power Company and Tohoku Electric Power Co., Inc., Abdul Latif Jameel Energy launched its first micro wind turbines at Cape Erimo, Japan’s “Wind Town”. In the same year, Abdul Latif Jameel Land and the Al Muhaidib Group partnered to launch a new joint venture, Muheel, an Integrated Facilities Management company (IFM) in Saudi Arabia. Abdul Latif Jameel Logistics launched an express delivery service and e-commerce brand, S:mile.

In April 2019, Abdul Latif Jameel Motors was awarded the Gold Award for Business Transformation, for its JSAP program in the annual SAP Quality Awards, presented at a ceremony in Heidelberg, Germany. This was the first time a Saudi Arabian company had won the top SAP prize. In the same year, Almar Water Solutions, a part of Abdul Latif Jameel Energy, acquired a contract to develop a desalination plant in the city of Shuqaiq, on the Red Sea coast of Saudi Arabia.

In November 2021, it was reported that Abdul Latif Jameel's investment unit had accumulated almost 114 million shares in Rivian, which was valued at almost $11.5 billion on the closing day of Rivian's IPO.

In September 2022, the company was listed by Forbes in the Middle East's Top 100 Arab Family Businesses, ranking seventh.

Management 
The founder, Abdul Latif Jameel, ran the company from its formation until his death in 1993, when his son, Mohammed Abdul Latif Jameel, became chairman and president. Mohammed's eldest son, Fady Mohammed Abdul Latif Jameel, serves as deputy president and vice chairman of Abdul Latif Jameel. Mohammed's middle son, Hassan Jameel, serves as deputy president and vice chairman of domestic Saudi Arabia operations.

Operations 
Abdul Latif Jameel has dual headquarters in Jeddah (Saudi Arabia) and Dubai (United Arab Emirates), and affiliated corporate offices in Riyadh (Saudi Arabia), Istanbul (Turkey) and Tokyo (Japan). Through various subsidiaries, it operates in six sectors:

 Transportation – including the import, distribution, wholesale and retail of passenger vehicles, commercial vehicles, and equipment and logistics.
 Engineering and Manufacturing – including automotive parts manufacturing.
 Financial Services – including automotive, consumer products and real estate financing and insurance brokerage services.
 Energy and Environmental Services – including renewable energy (particularly solar PV, but also wind), energy efficiency and environmental services.
 Land and Real Estate – including residential and commercial property development and commercial property investments.
 Advertising and Media – including out-of-home media and a full-service marketing and advertising agency.
 Consumer Products – including import, distribution wholesale and retail of consumer durables and electronics (brown and white goods) and an ecommerce platform.

Subsidiaries 
The company currently owns and operates the below subsidiaries:

Abdul Latif Jameel Motors: The passenger car division, which distributes Toyota and Lexus vehicles in Saudi Arabia and other markets across the Middle East, Europe and Asia. It also distributes Ford vehicles in Egypt.

Abdul Latif Jameel Enterprises: The diversification arm of the group in Saudi Arabia. 

Abdul Latif Jameel Machinery: This division handles commercial vehicles, and heavy equipment and materials. It distributes Komatsu, Toyota, BT and Raymond fork-lift trucks, HINO trucks, Manitou telehandlers, Loxa cement equipment and Teksan generators in Saudi Arabia and North Africa.

Abdul Latif Jameel Finance: This division operates in Saudi Arabia, with affiliates in Turkey and Egypt.

Abdul Latif Jameel Energy: The renewable energy and environmental services division.

Abdul Latif Jameel Land: The real estate development division in Saudi Arabia.

Abdul Latif Jameel Electronics: The consumer products division in Saudi Arabia.

Abdul Latif Jameel also has an advertising and media division, consisting of the advertising agency DelphysME (a JV with Delphys of Japan) and the company’s captive outdoor advertising company in Saudi Arabia. It also has an engineering and manufacturing division that handles the aftermarket vehicles parts businesses.

Philanthropy 

 Abdul Latif Jameel Community Initiatives, the global philanthropy of Abdul Latif Jameel, was established in 2003. It was renamed 'Community Jameel' in 2016. It engages in socio-economic initiatives across six focus areas:

 Job creation across the Middle East (through Bab Rizq Jameel)
 Global poverty alleviation
 Global water and food issues
 Education and training 
 Health and social schemes
 Promoting Arabic arts and culture through Art Jameel

 In 2005, with support from Abdul Latif Jameel Community Initiatives, the Poverty Action Lab based at MIT was renamed the Abdul Latif Jameel Poverty Action Lab (J-PAL), in honor of Sheikh Abdul Latif Jameel.
 In 2006, Art Jameel (the sister organization of Community Jameel that engages with arts and culture), launched the first Jameel Prize, an international award for contemporary art and design inspired by Islamic tradition, at the V&A.
 In 2007, Community Jameel created Bab Rizq Jameel (BRJ) which was to be dedicated entirely to the job creation programs, including training programs designed to end in employment. Between 2003 and 2015, BRJ helped approximately 490,000 people in Saudi Arabia and around 720,000 people across the region to find employment. In 2015, Bab Rizq Jameel generated 81,057 employment opportunities in Saudi Arabia. BRJ also set up the Jameel Bazaar, which is a commercial incubator space that allows female entrepreneurs to open their small shops and offices.
 In 2011, Community Jameel inaugurated a new branch of Bab Rizq Jameel in Istanbul, Turkey.
 In 2014, the Abdul Latif Jameel World Water and Food Systems Lab (J-WAFS) at MIT was created to conduct research aimed at preventing shortage of food and water due to climate change and population growth. In 2015, a program for the commercialization of this research was formed.
 Saudi Aramco announced its partnership with Community Jameel for a traffic safety program in Saudi Arabia’s Western region in July 2014.
 In March 2015, BRJ won an award in the CSR category of the Arab Social Media Influencers Awards.

See also 
 Abdul Latif Jameel Poverty Action Lab

References

External links 

1945 establishments in Saudi Arabia
Conglomerate companies of Saudi Arabia
Automotive companies
Automotive companies established in 1945